Onward Australia is a 1944 book by Ion Idriess which proposes how Australia could be developed. It was part of the Battle for Australia series.

References

1944 non-fiction books
Australian non-fiction books
Books by Ion Idriess
Angus & Robertson books